Vítor Manuel Afonso Damas de Oliveira (8 October 1947 – 13 September 2003), known as Damas, was a Portuguese footballer who played as a goalkeeper.

In a 23-year professional career he was mainly linked with Sporting, but he also played for three other teams, including Racing de Santander in La Liga.

A Portugal international for 17 years, Damas represented the country at the 1986 World Cup and Euro 1984, both in his mid-to-late 30s.

Club career
Born in Lisbon, Damas made his professional debut with hometown club Sporting CP at the age of just 19. After two years as a backup he became the capital side's undisputed starter, winning two Primeira Liga and three Taça de Portugal trophies, including the double in 1973–74.

Damas moved to Spain in the summer of 1976, signing with Racing de Santander. He was also first choice at the Cantabrians, spending the last of his four seasons in the Segunda División.

Aged nearly 33, Damas returned to Portugal, playing two years apiece with Vitória S.C. and Portimonense SC, after which he rejoined Sporting. He still went on to produce five more respectable campaigns, only losing his status in 1988–89 to Uruguayan Rodolfo Rodríguez.

Following his retirement at almost 42, Damas remained at Sporting as goalkeepers' coach. Over the course of two separate seasons he acted as interim manager with the Lions, coaching the team to three wins, one draw and two losses. He died aged 55 from cancer, in Lisbon.

International career
Damas earned 29 caps for the Portugal national team, from 6 April 1969 to 11 July 1986. He was second choice at both UEFA Euro 1984 and the 1986 FIFA World Cup, backing up S.L. Benfica's Manuel Bento; however, in the latter tournament, the starter suffered a serious fibula injury in training, and he took the pitch for group stage losses against Poland (1–0) and Morocco (3–1).

Honours
Sporting CP
Primeira Liga: 1969–70, 1973–74
Taça de Portugal: 1970–71, 1972–73, 1973–74
Supertaça Cândido de Oliveira: 1987

References

External links

1947 births
2003 deaths
Footballers from Lisbon
Portuguese footballers
Association football goalkeepers
Primeira Liga players
Sporting CP footballers
Vitória S.C. players
Portimonense S.C. players
La Liga players
Segunda División players
Racing de Santander players
Portugal youth international footballers
Portugal under-21 international footballers
Portugal international footballers
UEFA Euro 1984 players
1986 FIFA World Cup players
Portuguese expatriate footballers
Expatriate footballers in Spain
Portuguese expatriate sportspeople in Spain
Portuguese football managers
Primeira Liga managers
Sporting CP managers
Atlético Clube de Portugal managers
Sporting CP B managers
Deaths from cancer in Portugal